Uladzimir Konan (born 1934, Hrodna, Belarus; d. 6 June 2011) was a Belarusian philosopher. He was born in the Hrodna region of Belarus. He graduated from Belarusian State University's History faculty and worked with the Institute of Philosophy and Law of the Belarusian National Academy of Sciences.

1934 births
2011 deaths
Belarusian philosophers
People from Grodno